The 2006 American National Rugby League season was the ninth annual American National Rugby League (AMNRL) season, and the 26th since the first season of semi-professional rugby league began in North America. The season began on May 17, 2006 with a match between defending premiers Glen Mills Bulls and the Philadelphia Fight, played at Jack Pearson Stadium. The same venue hosted the Grand Final between the Connecticut Wildcats and Glen Mills Bulls on August 19, 2006 in front of a crowd of 2,500.

Three expansion teams, the Jacksonville Axemen, the New Haven Warriors, and the Boston Braves joined the AMNRL for the 2006 season. With these additions, there were eleven teams that participated throughout the ten rounds of the regular season. After the regular season concluded, six of these teams qualified for the first week of the playoff series, with the Connecticut Wildcats victors in the Grand Final, securing their second championship title.

Pre-season
Three new teams entered the competition for the 2006 season which took the number of teams in the American National Rugby League to eleven. These teams were the Jacksonville Axemen, Boston Braves (whom were originally called the Boston Wolfhounds), and the New Haven Warriors. It was originally believed that a team from Chicago would also enter the competition but the AMNRL turned down their application.

Regular season results

Ladder

Playoffs

Week 1

Week 2

Championship Match
The season culminated on August 19, 2006, with the 4th placed Connecticut Wildcats defeating the minor premiers Glen Mills Bulls 36-28 in the Grand Final Championship Match in front of 2,500 people at Jack Pearson Stadium in Concordville, Pennsylvania. The victory was Connecticut's second premiership in successive years.

See also
 American National Rugby League
 Rugby league in 2006

Footnotes

External links
Official websites
 American National Rugby League Online
 Club profiles at Amnrl.com

News sites
 AMNRL News
 AMNRL rugby league review World news 
 AMNRL League Unlimited

AMNRL
AMNRL
American National Rugby League seasons